László Bíró (born 9 July 1960) is a Hungarian wrestler. He competed at the 1980 Summer Olympics and the 1988 Summer Olympics.

References

External links
 

1960 births
Living people
Hungarian male sport wrestlers
Olympic wrestlers of Hungary
Wrestlers at the 1980 Summer Olympics
Wrestlers at the 1988 Summer Olympics
People from Tura, Hungary
Sportspeople from Pest County